Victor Ruffy (18 January 1823, in Lutry – 29 December 1869) was a Swiss politician elected to the Federal Council of Switzerland on 6 December 1867

He died in office on 29 December 1869, and was affiliated with the Free Democratic Party of Switzerland.

During his time in office he held the following departments:
Department of Finance (1868)
Military Department (1869)

His son Eugène Ruffy (1854–1919) was member of the Federal Council from 1893 to 1899.

References

External links

1823 births
1869 deaths
People from Lavaux-Oron District
Swiss Calvinist and Reformed Christians
Free Democratic Party of Switzerland politicians
Members of the Federal Council (Switzerland)
Finance ministers of Switzerland
Members of the National Council (Switzerland)
Presidents of the National Council (Switzerland)
Federal Supreme Court of Switzerland judges
19th-century Swiss judges
19th-century Swiss politicians